Anderson de Lima Freitas (born November 12, 1979 in Rio Grande do Norte, Brazil), known as just Anderson Lima or just Anderson, is a Brazilian former professional footballer.

Football career

He started his career at the local football club, America de Natal. He had stayed here for three years, before signed with Vila Nova Futebol Clube, at the age of twenty. From there, he was located by the scouters of Apollon Athens and brought him to Athens for trials. In the summer of 2002, he was transferred to Atromitos F.C., in the Greek Beta Ethniki.

After 22 appearances and 4 goals during this season, Anderson Lima moved to Chalkidona F.C., which was playing in Alpha Ethniki. His first season as a member of Chalkidona (2003–04, he took part in 21 matches, scoring 3 goals. Also, the first half of the next period (2005–06), he played 13 matches and scored 2 goals, wearing Chalkidona's kit.

On January 7, 2005, he became a player of Panathinaikos F.C. He make his debut wearing the greens in a match against AEK Athens F.C. In this match, he injured seriously in his right leg, and he stopped playing football for a month.

He returned to Atromitos on August 16, 2006. During his second passing as a player of Atromitos, he made 16 appearances and scored 1 goal. He also played against Sevilla at the UEFA Cup. His last year in Atromitos, was his last year as a professional footballer. However, he played a few matches for AO Dikaiou, an amateur football club based in Kos, in 2009.

After his playing career, he became a players' spokesman.

External links
Profile and statistics at insports.eu
Anderson LIma de Freitas:Where are now fotballers?

References

1979 births
Living people
Brazilian footballers
Super League Greece players
Chalkidona F.C. players
Atromitos F.C. players
Panathinaikos F.C. players
Association football midfielders